John Hull Campbell (October 10, 1800 – January 19, 1868) was an American politician from Pennsylvania who was an American Party member in the U.S. House of Representatives for Pennsylvania's 3rd congressional district from 1845 to 1847.

Early life and education
Campbell was born in York, Pennsylvania. He studied law, was admitted to the bar in Philadelphia in 1823 and commenced practice there.

Career
Campbell was elected to the Pennsylvania House of Representatives in 1831.

Campbell was elected as a candidate of the American Party to the Twenty-ninth Congress. He declined to be a candidate for renomination in 1846 and instead resumed his law practic He died in Philadelphia in 1868.

He was interred in Monument Cemetery in Philadelphia and reinterred in 1956 at Lawnview Memorial Park in Rockledge, Pennsylvania.

References

External links

1800 births
1868 deaths
19th-century American politicians
Burials at Lawnview Memorial Park
Burials at Monument Cemetery
Know-Nothing members of the United States House of Representatives from Pennsylvania
Members of the Pennsylvania House of Representatives
Pennsylvania Know Nothings
Pennsylvania lawyers
Politicians from Philadelphia
Politicians from York, Pennsylvania
19th-century American lawyers
Members of the United States House of Representatives from Pennsylvania